Post-amendment to the Tamil Nadu Entertainments Tax Act 1939 on 1 April 1958, Gross jumped to 140 per cent of Nett  Commercial Taxes Department disclosed 88 crore in entertainment tax revenue for the year.

A list of films produced in the Tamil film industry in India in 1994 by release date:

Films

January — March

April — June

July — September

October — December

References 

Films, Tamil
1994
Lists of 1994 films by country or language
1990s Tamil-language films